UBTECH Robotics Inc. is a manufacturer of robots based in Los Angeles, California.

History 
Ubtech was founded in 2012 by James Zhou. Ubtech specializes in humanoid robots. Ubtech exhibited at IFA Berlin in 2017 and showed its latest innovations.

In 2018, the Italian mobile communications provider Telecom Italia Mobile set a Guinness world record for simultaneous dance for robots with 1,372 Alpha S1 robots from Ubtech. The old record was 1,069 robots. In 2020 its robots were used to help medical workers treating COVID-19 patients in Shenzhen.

After a Series-C funding round by Tencent and ICBC it was valued at $5 billion. It was planning an IPO as of 2019.

In December 2021, the company delivered pint-sized robots to 300 pre-schools in Seoul, South Korea.

In January 2022, Ubtech launched a mobile robot that emits UV rays to disinfect. The robot was commercially launched in USA.

References 

Manufacturing companies based in Shenzhen
Robotics companies of China
Manufacturing companies established in 2012
Engineering companies of China
Chinese companies established in 2012